Evergrande New Energy Auto is Chinese automobile manufacturer owned by Evergrande Group. that specializes in developing electric vehicles.

History 

Evergrande was founded on August 28, 2019, and is located in China and Sweden. All of their vehicles are produced by founded marques. 

Evergrande's primary marque is Hengchi. 

After acquiring the assets of Saab from a bankruptcy estate in 2012, Evergrande also founded NEVS, while Koenigsegg had a brief cooperation with Evergrande which resulted in Evergrande taking a minority stake (20%) in the Swedish super car brand.

References 

Electric vehicle manufacturers of China
Car brands
Car manufacturers of China
Chinese brands